Old Mill Creek may refer to:

 Old Mill Creek, Illinois, in Lake County, Illinois
 Old Mill Creek (Arroyo Corte Madera del Presidio), in Marin County, California